Qaleh-ye Shah Vali Shahid Rajayi (also Romanized as Qal‘eh-ye Shāh Valī Shahīd Rajāyī) is a village in Rig Rural District, in the Central District of Lordegan County, Chaharmahal and Bakhtiari Province, Iran. At the 2006 census, its population was 59, in 13 families.

References 

Populated places in Lordegan County